Bachpan is a 1970 Indian Hindi-language drama film directed and produced by Kotayya Pratyagatma and written by Raj Baldev Raj. The film stars Sanjeev Kumar and Tanuja.

Plot 
The movie "Bachpan" is about three friends, Ram (Master Sachin), Rahim (Mahboob Master) and Tom (Master Alankar). Ram is an orphan who lives with his aunt; Rahim lives with his father and horse (badshah); Tom lives with his father (Keshto Mukherjee) and mother very unhappily, They love the toyseller Kashi (Sanjeev Kumar) and the flower seller lady Lajjo (Tanuja). Kashi lost his wife and children in an accident and spends his life with their memory. The story takes a turn when the smuggler Nekichand kills his side-kick and innocent Kashi was arrested for the murder. But those three kids were present there. As Kashi was drunk at the time of the murder he cannot recall anything, so he never tries to defend himself. Those three kids try to free their dear Kashi Chacha. Tom's father John fights his case and Ram gives witnesses in his favour. His witness and the evidence help in releasing innocent Kashi. Ram's aunt also comes to the court and admits that Nekichand is the killer of Ram's father and she was trying to guard him as he is her brother. When Ram discovers that Nekichand is his father's killer, he wants to take revenge. Ultimately Nekichand was arrested by the police with the initiative of Ram and Kashi. At the end, Kashi realises that the life should go on, and one cannot spend his entire life in the memory of the dead. Hence, he decides to marry Lajjo, who silently loved him from the very beginning.

Cast 

 Sanjeev Kumar as Kashi
 Tanuja as Lajwanti
 Sachin Pilgaonkar as Ram
 Master Mehboob as Rahim
 Master Alankar as Tom
 Keshto Mukherjee as Tom's father
 Mukri as Rahim's father
 Joginder Shelly as Kundan
 Sunder as School Teacher

Soundtrack 
Lyrics by Anand Bakshi

References

External links 
 

1970 films
1970s Hindi-language films
1970 drama films
Films scored by Laxmikant–Pyarelal
Films directed by Kotayya Pratyagatma